A balanced-arm lamp, sometimes called a floating arm lamp, is a lamp with an adjustable folding arm which is constructed such that the force due to gravity is always counteracted by springs, regardless of the position of the arms of the lamp. Many lamp brands (such as the Anglepoise, originator of the concept, and Luxo L-1), as well as other devices, use this principle.

Configuration

The five terms 

This article uses the terminology:

 lamp cap,
 forearm, 
 upper arm,
 stand or body and
 base
for the five basic parts of these lamps.

The general design 
A balanced-arm lamp has a base, a stand or body, (in most cases) two connected arms (in many cases fitted with springs), and a lamp-head.

The lamp can be moved into almost any position, and the balancing device will maintain the position until moved again.

The same overall mechanism can be employed in other devices with similar requirements, such as:
 copy holders for typists,
 microphone holders in studios or
 computer display holders.

For the physics and theory behind balanced-arm lamps, see Classical mechanics, linkage and torque.

There are different methods to balance the arms and the lamp-cap:
 coil springsIn some cases a set of two coil springs working in parallel on both sides of the pivoting arm is used.(They function in the same way as a single spring.)
 counterweight(s)(a method frequently used in Sash windows and drawing boards).
 Friction between parts of the lamp arm,
 Coupling or
 hydraulics or pneumatic arms.

Lamps balanced with springs

There are many variations of construction with springs. Springs can be located on the mechanical equivalent of the forearm or the upper arm, or both, as well as nearer to the base. Some lamps use tension springs, and others use compression springs. The adjacent image shows (left to right) a compression spring at rest, then under load, followed by a tension spring at rest, and then under load. 
Springs have a limited lifting capacity and extension length.
Some springs can resonate, producing low-level unwanted noise.

One tension spring

Spring-balanced upper arm, flexible forearm 

This lamp has a stiff flexible tube as its forearm, and a spring-balanced arm to support it near the middle. That way there is a flexible lamp with a long reach.

Tension spring over wheels 

The wheel to control the forearm is smaller than the wheel that controls the upper arm.
The lamp cap rotates the same direction as the upper arm and forearm.

Two arms, one spring, one toothed wheel 

With this technique the tension spring has a double function: it controls both the forearm and the upper arm. This is not a common arm lamp system.
The lamp cap rotates the same direction as the upper arm and forearm.

Two tension springs

Two parallelograms and two tension spring sets 

One tension spring set controls the forearm, which is a parallelogram having two bars. A stronger spring set controls the upper arm, which has three parallel bars (see photo, left). (There is a less stable construction with two parallel bars in the upper arm which is less expensive to manufacture.) Due to the parallel linkage of the lamp, the lamp cap keeps pointing in the same vertical direction when adjusting the height of the lamp. As with most balanced-arm lamps, the whole assembly can rotate in the horizontal plane, and is mounted on a stable foot.

One parallelogram and two extension spring sets 

A lamp like the Anglepoise lamp has one parallelogram and two extension springs. One spring controls the shortest arm of a parallelogram. Parallel to this shortest arm there is the forearm. To keep these arms parallel there are two other parallel arms (upper arm) that are controlled by a second extension spring.
The lamp cap rotates the same direction as the upper arm and forearm.

Single forearm bar, one parallelogram, two tension spring sets 

The forearm of this lamp consist of a single bar. When it is adjusted, the angle of the lamp cap changes along with the arm.

Tension springs within the arms 

A lamp like the Tolomeo desk lamp has no parallelograms in either arm. In this modern lamp the tension springs are hidden in the arms. The lamp cap rotates the same direction as the upper arm and forearm.

Compression springs

Compression springs in the arms 

The short arms (green) stay parallel. One spring puts pull force on the blue arm. (If the blue arm is tilted back the second spring on this arm gets push force.) The blue arm controls the two parallel arms (red) that make up the upper arm. The other spring puts pull force on the other blue arm. This arm controls the forearm (magenta). The two springs can be the same size; one spring has to lift more weight but is more vertical. The other spring lifts less weight but is more horizontal.

Compression springs near the foot 

One compression spring controls a very short arm (grey). The Roller chain cable connects this arm parallel to the forearm (yellow). The longer spring controls the (blue) arm. The body (red) can turn in the horizontal plane. The body is connected to a stable foot. The body can be smaller because the pressure springs can protrude below the body.

A compression spring with one parallelogram 

In this method, just one compression spring controls a pantographic  arm.

Lamps balanced by pressure and friction

Rubber between two "parallel" arms 
In this construction (commonly found in Italian lamps) gravity causes the parallelogram to deform such that the gap between the long arms becomes smaller. This in turn increases pressure on the rubber in the gap, and the resulting friction holds the arm in place.

Friction from twisting 

The friction between the twisted arm controls the movement between the arms.

Friction between the upper arm and the forearm 

This arm system also works with friction.

Lamps balanced with counterweight

Lamps balanced with one counterweight 
Advantages of one swinging counterbalance is that the lamp can have a longer arm length.

Disadvantages are that the lamp is inherently less balanced, thus it needs a heavy stand to remain stable.

A single counterweight 

This construction uses a chain to keep the arm with the counterweight and the forearm parallel. The lamp-cap and counterweight move in opposite directions (both away from the base or both towards it). The balance that is required is shown by the following formula:

d1 = Lamp-cap to base; m1 = weight of lamp-cap

d2 = counterweight to base; m2 = weight of counterweight

m1 × d1 = m2 × d2

One parallelogram with one counterweight 

This lamp  has a heavy base, with a parallelogram pantograph construction formed by bars which are all hinged on each other. One long bar extends past the parallelogram construction and has a counterweight. One short bar also extends past the parallelogram construction and holds the lamp cap.
The base has an arc formed stand so the counterweight does not hit the stand in vertical position.

One parallelogram with an extended counterweight 

This lamp is similar to the one above, but as the counterweight has a low position the lamp needs no heavy foot for stability as the center of gravity is low.
The counterbalance does not swing, but slides and rotates safely around the center of the stand.

Three parallelograms with one counterweight 

This lamp stand has a complex construction with matching narrow openings.
This lamp is out of production.

Lamps balanced with two counterweights

A single arm with two counterweights 

With this lamp the movement is very limited (the arm moves up and down only) but the technique is nice to look at. As the forearm becomes more horizontal the weight ceases to be balanced on both side of the base. The weight of the base is needed to avoid over-balancing.

Two arms with two counterweights 

A lamp type like the Tizio works like this. A balancing arm (the forearm) has on one side of an axis a small counterweight and on the other side a lamp cap. These parts are lifted by a second bigger balancing arm (the upper arm) that has on the other side of a second axis a heavier counterweight. The lamp designed by Edouard-Wilfrid Buquet in 1927 works in this way. The lamp is in the collection of the Museum of Modern Art. The two axes have a different angle, and this has some advantages.

Lamp-cap x fore-Arm = Arm x Small weight (Lamp-cap + Small weight) x upper-arm = Arm x Big weight.

Lamps using other systems 

Here are some less common ways of balancing arms.

Lamps having a vertical axis 

This kind of lamp has a forearm balanced by weight or springs. Its disadvantage is that the upper arm cannot point up or forwards.

Mechanical coupling devices 

This lamp works by coupling together the upper arm and the forearm. It is called a gravity-locked or cam-locked elbow.

Hydraulic arm 

The pivoting arm streetlamps in the Schouwburgplein, Rotterdam use a pair of hydraulic cylinders to control the forearm and upper arm.

Pneumatic arm 

Arm lamp with a pneumatic cylinder. The gravity compress the air in the pneumatic cylinder.

In popular culture

 Two spring-balanced desk lamps of this type feature as the main characters in the 1986 Pixar short film Luxo Jr.. It also serves as the letter I in the Pixar logo presented before and at the end of each of their films.
 Myster Shadow-Sky is the only composer who from 1980 to 2007 performed the balanced-arm lamp as a musical instrument: the archisonic lamp. In 1980 he wrote the score "Ludus Musicae Temporarium" for a balanced arm lamp orchestra. The world premiere was performed by Les Percussions de Strasbourg at the Manca contemporary music festival in Nice in 1988. He released five albums with a four spring balanced arm lamp musical instrument (and more with other musical instruments). They are available for free download. Referenced in the book "Les chercheurs de sons" (2004), as the unique creator of a balanced arm lamp as a musical instrument.

See also

 Engineering science and mechanics 
 Gooseneck lamp
 Industrial design
 Light fixture
 Mechanical advantage
 Mechanical engineering technology
 Moment (physics)
 Torsion spring

Patents history

Classifications IPC: F21V21/26

International patent category: B23B31/171
 GB191104491 An Improved Device for Supporting or Suspending Electric Lamps and the like (1911)
  - 1921 harmonica arm
  1923 parallelogram & counter weight
  1926 friction
  1929 2 counter weight
  1934 spring and counter weight
 FR757890 1934 CARWARDINE GEORGE
 FR784932 1935 CARWARDINE GEORGE
  1937 friction
  1938 2 parallelogram 2 springs 
  1939 2 pressure springs
  19..  a-symmetric arm-lamp
  1947 friction and a spring
  1949 
  1949 spring in the arm
  1954 friction arm

  -- 1961
  1971
  - 1991 -
 EP0518569 1992
 EP1274545  2003  mechanical coupling devices

References

Light fixtures